Bedell Bridge State Park, also known as Bedell Bridge State Historic Site, is a  state park located in Haverhill, New Hampshire, on the Connecticut River. It is open year-round and offers walking, picnicking, non-motorized boating, and fishing. A Fish and Game boat launch is located within the park.

History
The property is the site of the former Bedell Covered Bridge, which was the second-longest covered bridge in the United States, until its destruction by wind in 1979. The bridge's stone piers still remain in the river. The bridge formerly connected Haverhill to Newbury, Vermont.

Notes

References

External links
Bedell Bridge State Historic Site New Hampshire Department of Natural and Cultural Resources

State parks of New Hampshire
Parks in Grafton County, New Hampshire
Haverhill, New Hampshire
1970 establishments in New Hampshire